Ingraham Township is a township in Mills County, Iowa, USA.

History
Ingraham Township was organized in 1855.

References

Townships in Mills County, Iowa
Townships in Iowa